Sørnes Church is a parish church of the Church of Norway in Sola Municipality in Rogaland county, Norway. It is located in the village of Sørnes. It is the church for the Sørnes parish which is part of the Tungenes prosti (deanery) in the Diocese of Stavanger. The large, brick church was built in a cruciform design in 1977 using designs by the architect Tor Sørensen. The church seats about 240 people, but it has movable walls which can enlarge the sanctuary to seat about 500 people.

See also
List of churches in Rogaland

References

Sola, Norway
Churches in Rogaland
Brick churches in Norway
17th-century Church of Norway church buildings
Churches completed in 1977
1977 establishments in Norway